Tritone may refer to:

 Tritone (music), or augmented fourth, a dissonant interval of two pitches
 Tritone (telephony), or special information tones (SIT), a sequence of three tones played to indicate that a call did not go through
 Tritone (printing), an image printing method
 An image reproduced using three colors
 RGB color model
 Color television
 Digital camera
 Color printing
 Newt, a group of amphibians

See also 
 Tritones (disambiguation)
 Triton (disambiguation)
 Tritonia (disambiguation)